Underground Rustlers is a 1941 American Western film directed by S. Roy Luby. The film is the eleventh in Monogram Pictures' "Range Busters" series, and it stars Ray "Crash" Corrigan as Crash, John "Dusty" King as Dusty and Max "Alibi" Terhune as Alibi, with Gwen Gaze, Robert Blair and Forrest Taylor. It's also known as Bullets and Bullion (US review title).

Cast 
Ray Corrigan as "Crash" Corrigan
John "Dusty" King as "Dusty" King
Max Terhune as "Alibi" Terhune
Elmer as Elmer, Alibi's Dummy
Gwen Gaze as Irene Bently
Robert Blair as Martin Ford
Forrest Taylor as Jim Bently
Tom London as Henchman Tom Harris
Steve Clark as Henchman Jake Smith
Bud Osborne as Sheriff

Soundtrack 
 John "Dusty" King "Following the Trail" (Written by Jean George)
 John "Dusty" King - "Sweetheart of the Range" (Written by Harry Tobias, Roy Ingraham and Mickey Ford)

See also
The Range Busters series:

 The Range Busters (1940)
 Trailing Double Trouble (1940)
 West of Pinto Basin (1940)
 Trail of the Silver Spurs (1941)
 The Kid's Last Ride (1941)
 Tumbledown Ranch in Arizona (1941)
 Wrangler's Roost (1941)
 Fugitive Valley (1941)
 Saddle Mountain Roundup (1941)
 Tonto Basin Outlaws (1941)
 Underground Rustlers (1941)
 Thunder River Feud (1942)
 Rock River Renegades (1942)
 Boot Hill Bandits (1942)
 Texas Trouble Shooters (1942)
 Arizona Stage Coach (1942)
 Texas to Bataan (1942)
 Trail Riders (1942)
 Two Fisted Justice (1943)
 Haunted Ranch (1943)
 Land of Hunted Men (1943)
 Cowboy Commandos (1943)
 Black Market Rustlers (1943)
 Bullets and Saddles (1943)

External links 

1941 films
1941 Western (genre) films
1940s English-language films
American black-and-white films
Monogram Pictures films
American Western (genre) films
Films directed by S. Roy Luby
Range Busters
1940s American films